Luen Wo Hui or Luen Wo Market is a market town east of Fanling in the New Territories of Hong Kong. It is located northeast of Fanling station.

Administration
For electoral purposes, Luen Wo Hui is part of the Luen Wo Hui constituency of the North District Council. It is currently represented by Chow Kam-ho, who was elected in the local elections.

History
Luen Wo Hui was formerly a market founded by villages in the surrounding area and later became a town. The old market has now ceased to operate and only a few structures are left. A new indoor market to replace the pre-existing market was officially opened in 2002.

New private housing estates have in the last 10 years been built north of the market. Across Sha Tau Kok Road are industrial buildings.

Market building
Luen Wo Market building is listed as a Grade III historic building.

See also
 Hooked on You, a 2007 film set there. The name of the market building was changed to "Fortune Market" in the film.

References

Further reading
 

Fanling
Places in Hong Kong
Retail markets in Hong Kong
Grade III historic buildings in Hong Kong